Team New Zealand or TNZ is a sailing team based in Auckland, New Zealand representing the Royal New Zealand Yacht Squadron.

Team New Zealand became a household name in their home country following their consecutive wins in the America's Cup in 1995 and 2000, under the leadership of Sir Peter Blake, when becoming the first team from a country outside the United States to win and successfully defend the America's Cup. Branded as Emirates Team New Zealand at America's Cup competitions since 2007, they won the 2017 America's Cup, skippered by Glenn Ashby. They are the winner of the 2021 America's Cup.

History 
Three challenges were launched before the founding of Team New Zealand, all of these backed by Michael Fay. New Zealand Challenge competed in the 1987 Louis Vuitton Cup, the 1988 America's Cup and the 1992 Louis Vuitton Cup.

Founding 
Following the 1992 competition, Michael Fay withdrew from backing the New Zealand challenges and a new effort under the leadership of Sir Peter Blake began putting a team together, raising funds and gaining support for the Royal New Zealand Yacht Squadron. Team New Zealand Limited was established as a registered company in 1993.

1995: Black Magic 

In 1995, TNZ beat Team Dennis Conner 5–0 in a major upset off San Diego, California after winning the right to challenge in the Louis Vuitton Cup. Their boats were fast, they had an experienced crew led by skipper Russell Coutts, and they were ably led by Sir Peter Blake. As NZL 32 approached the finish line on the last race, sailing commentator Pete Montgomery made the now famous line "The America's Cup is now New Zealand's cup!"

The winning yacht, NZL 32, was shipped back to New Zealand and given to the Te Papa Museum, and is now housed in an extension to the northern end of the National Maritime Museum in Auckland as part of a permanent exhibition, Blue Water, Black Magic, about Sir Peter Blake.

2000: "Still New Zealand's Cup" 
TNZ (NZL 60) beat Italy's Prada Challenge (Luna Rossa) 5–0 in the 2000 match held on Auckland's Hauraki Gulf. On crossing the finish line in the final race, commentator Peter Montgomery exclaimed "The America's Cup is still New Zealand's cup!!" – echoing his comment in 1995 America's Cup.
A notable feature was Russell Coutts handing over the helm to Dean Barker in the final race.

2003: "Loyal"; Defeat 
In 2003, Team New Zealand's eight-year reign ended after they were defeated 5–0 by Swiss-based challenger Alinghi. TNZ dubbed their campaign the "Loyal" campaign, featuring a Silver fern flag with the word "Loyal" and an existing song of the same name by New Zealand musician Dave Dobbyn. This was largely due to the Swiss boat featuring many of the afterguard members from TNZ's previous campaigns (notably Russell Coutts and Brad Butterworth) which, along with a fast boat and a lack of reliability aboard TNZ's NZL 82, contributed to the win.

2007: Emirates Team New Zealand 

In 2007, the re-branded Emirates Team New Zealand won the Louis Vuitton Cup and advanced to the 32nd America's Cup against defenders Alinghi. Team New Zealand lost the series 2–5 to Alinghi, the last by a single second.

Valencia 
In late 2003, TNZ announced their intention to challenge Alinghi at the 2007 Valencia America's Cup, with Emirates on board as title sponsor, and Grant Dalton as Team Boss. Dean Barker skippered a more international team than ever before. TNZ were among the "big four" syndicates leading up to the 2007 Cup. The big four consisted of TNZ, Alinghi, BMW Oracle Racing, and Luna Rossa.

In the Louis Vuitton Cup 2007 to select the challenger to face Alinghi, TNZ lost their first match to Mascalzone Latino-Capitalia Team, a team who they had beaten in each of their five encounters in the Louis Vuitton Acts. They then won their next 7 races, before losing the final two in round robin 1 to Luna Rossa and BMW Oracle Racing which put them in third place at the end of the first round robin. In Round Robin 2, Team New Zealand were undefeated throughout, taking first place from BMW Oracle Racing. They won their semi-final series 5–2 against Desafío Español 2007 and qualified for the Louis Vuitton finals against Luna Rossa. In the finals, they defeated Luna Rossa with a whitewash victory of 5–0, winning the Louis Vuitton Cup and the right to challenge Alinghi for the America's Cup.

On 3 July 2007, Emirates Team New Zealand lost their final race to Alinghi bringing Alinghi's race wins to 5, successfully defending the 32nd America's cup.

Americas Cup...
 Race 1: Lost to Alinghi by 35 seconds
 Race 2: Beat Alinghi by 28 seconds
 Race 3: Beat Alinghi by 25 seconds
 Race 4: Lost to Alinghi by 30 seconds
 Race 5: Lost to Alinghi by 19 seconds
 Race 6: Lost to Alinghi by 28 seconds
 Race 7: Lost to Alinghi by 1 second

Alinghi won the America's Cup, 5–2.

2009 Louis Vuitton Pacific Series 
Team New Zealand hosted the Louis Vuitton Pacific Series in January and February 2009 on the Waitematā Harbour in the Hauraki Gulf, Auckland. Team New Zealand defeated Alinghi by a margin of 3 races to 1 in the final. The final races were reduced to the best of five due to difficult weather conditions resulting in the loss of one day's racing.

2010 Louis Vuitton Trophy 
In March 2010, the Louis Vuitton Trophy regatta returned to Auckland after the first regatta of the series in Nice in November 2009 won by Italy's Azzurra team. On Sunday 21 March 2010, Emirates Team New Zealand won the final of the Louis Vuitton Trophy Auckland regatta with a 56 sec win over Mascalzone Latino.

2011–12 Volvo Ocean Race 

On 13 April 2010, along with Camper, the Spanish-based international footwear manufacturer, Emirates Team New Zealand announced that it would compete in the Volvo Ocean Race in 2011–12.

The campaign was run by Emirates Team New Zealand and skippered by Olympic and round-the-world yachtsman Chris Nicholson. Racing was very close with results of each leg often coming down to minutes and seconds at the finish line after thousands of miles of ocean racing. Emirates Team New Zealand came in second.

2013 America's Cup San Francisco 

On 21 April 2011, Grant Dalton and Emirates Team New Zealand announced their entry for the 2013 America's Cup regatta to be held in San Francisco in 2013. New sponsor Nespresso came on board through parent company Nestlé. Grant Dalton expressed his gratitude to numerous corporate interests based around the world, namely Matteo De Nora and Stephen Tindall among others, in keeping the team afloat through the intervening years in what had been a difficult four years since the last multi-challenger event in Valencia 2007.

The team also received a NZ$36m grant from the New Zealand government to compete in the 2013 America's Cup and to promote and export New Zealand expertise in the field of yachting. This followed on from an economic impact assessment of the 2007 campaign in Valencia had shown a direct economic benefit to New Zealand of $74.4m.

Because of the high cost associated with developing the new AC72 catamaran and the rule limitation of thirty sailing days of development, Team New Zealand entered into a technology sharing programme with the Italian team who had an identical boat and were also based in Auckland.

In August 2013, Team New Zealand won the America's Cup challenger series (Louis Vuitton Cup) by defeating the Prada Luna Rossa Syndicate 7–1 and in September 2013 Team New Zealand challenged the Oracle syndicate for the America's Cup.

The race series was very dramatic, with a number of incidents including Oracle Team USA being docked two points (meaning they started the competition on −2 points) and having two main crew members banned – one for the competition, the other for 4 of the races. In Race 8, Team New Zealand nearly capsized the boat due to a lack of hydraulic pressure which caused the boat to move, but the sail to stay in the same place.

By 19 September 2013, Team New Zealand lead Oracle Team USA 8–1 needing just one more win to take the Cup. In Race 13 Team New Zealand were minutes away from winning the cup when the race time limits came into effect, causing the race to be cancelled. The race was then replayed and Oracle Team USA won – and went on to win all last eight races to come from behind – and take the Cup. This win was facilitated by the American Syndicates ability Hydrofoil upwind. It had been the longest-ever event by both number of days and races, and the first since the 25th America's Cup to feature a winner-take-all final race.

Emirates Team New Zealand ruled out any post-racing legal challenge, with ETNZ syndicate head Grant Dalton stating that Oracle's automated stabilisation system had been checked and approved by the official measurers before the start of racing, and that taking legal action would be "an incredibly bad thing to do."

35th America's Cup 

In January 2014, Emirates Team New Zealand announced the signing of 2013 49er World and European Champions and 2012 Olympic Silver Medalists, Peter Burling and Blair Tuke. CEO Grant Dalton first said that the team would campaign two AC45's in future America's Cup World Series.

On 25 June 2014 Team New Zealand confirmed their intention to challenge, as they had gained sufficient private financial backing to need no further government assistance.

In the challenger series, Team New Zealand finished second in the round-robin stages behind America's Cup holders Oracle Team USA – the first time a Cup defender had participated in a challenger series. As the leading challenger, they chose to face Land Rover BAR in the first playoff round. Despite suffering a capsize in race 4, the outcome of the series was a 5–2 series victory for Team New Zealand. In the finals match against Artemis Racing, Team New Zealand secured a second 5–2 series win, and therefore progressed to the America's Cup series against Oracle Team USA.

Having won the challenger series, Oracle Team USA was able to impose a penalty point on the eventual challenger for the 35th America's Cup. Therefore, Team New Zealand started the 35th America's Cup racing with minus one point and would need to win eight races in order to get the 7 points needed to win the America's Cup. After five days of racing, which included nine races, Team New Zealand beat Oracle Team USA by eight races to one, or by 7 points to 1, and thereby won the Cup.

36th America's Cup 

The Prada cup series was sailed 15 January – 22 February 2021 to decide which challenger should race Team New Zealand; Luna Rossa, New York Yacht Club American Magic or INEOS TEAM UK. It was a round robin format over 16 racing days. Ineos was the first to qualify, going into the final undefeated. The American boat Patriot suffered hull damage and the onboard electronics were likely damaged due to water in the hull. After concerted efforts to get the boat ready again, with their competitors rallying to help, the boat met Luna Rossa but it became obvious there were still problems onboard. The Italian team won every race to proceed into the final to race Ineos. Luna Rossa defeated Ineos 7 – 1 and faced Emirates Team New Zealand in the 36th America's cup from 6 – 18 March 2021. Emirates Team New Zealand was successful in their defence of the cup, winning 7 – 3.

Results

Yachts used by Team New Zealand 
 NZL 32 – "Black Magic I" International America's Cup Class. 1995 America's Cup winner
 NZL 38 – "Black Magic II" International America's Cup Class. 1995 Louis Vuitton Cup winner
 NZL 57 – "Black Magic III" International America's Cup Class. Training boat for 2000 defence
 NZL 60 – "Black Magic IV" International America's Cup Class. 2000 America's Cup winner
 NZL 68 – International America's Cup Class. Training boat bought from Illbruck Challenge (formerly GER 68)
 NZL 81 – International America's Cup Class. Training boat for 2003 defence
 NZL 82 – International America's Cup Class. America's Cup defender in 2003 but defeated 5–0. Used for Louis Vuitton Acts in preparation for the 2007 America's Cup and won the 2004 season
 NZL 84 – 2007 generation International America's Cup Class. Launched in 2006. Won 2006 Louis Vuitton Season
 NZL 92 – 2007 generation International America's Cup Class. Launched in October 2006. Won the 2007 Louis Vuitton Cup. Lost the America's Cup 2–5
 CAMPER – 2011 generation Volvo VO70 – Volvo Open 70. Launched in April 2011 for the 2011–2012 Volvo Ocean Race, which they finished in second position overall.
 Other boats related to the 2013 America's Cup campaign: two SL33 catamarans, one AC45 catamaran
 NZL 2 – "New Zealand" AC72. Training boat for 2013 campaign
 NZL 5 – "Aotearoa" AC72. Race boat for 2013 campaign. Won the 2013 Louis Vuitton Cup. Lost the 2013 America's Cup 8–9
 NZL  – "RNZYS" AC45. Modified Race boat for 2017 campaign. Won the 2017 Louis Vuitton Cup. Won the 2017 America's Cup 7–1
 NZL  – "Te Rehutai" AC75. Foiling Race boat. 2021 America's Cup Winner

References

External links 

 Official Website of Emirates Team New Zealand
 Peter Lester NZ yachting commentator

|-

|-

 
1993 establishments in New Zealand
America's Cup teams
The Emirates Group
Waitematā Harbour